Alice was the name of a number of steamships

, a London and South Western Railway ship
SS Alice, an American sloop lost in the 1893 Cheniere Caminada hurricane
, an American sternwheel paddle steamer that sank in 1906
, a British, and later Belgian ship
, an Ulric Thomas ship

Ship names